12" Collection and More is compilation album released by the funk group Cameo in 1999. This 10-track collection represents Cameo's funkier side, and can be viewed as a companion piece to the previous year's The Ballads Collection. The album contains two versions of "She's Strange" and a previously unreleased mix of "Back and Forth".

Track listing
 "I Just Want to Be" – 6:17 – Blackmon, Johnson
 "Word Up!" – 5:56 – Blackmon, Jenkins
 "Shake Your Pants" – 6:21 – Blackmon
 "She's Strange" – 6:39 – Blackmon, Jenkins, Leftenant, Singleton
 "Candy" – 5:45 – Blackmon, Jenkins
 "Back and Forth" – 6:21 – Blackmon, Jenkins, Kendrick, Leftenant
 "Single Life" – 6:33 – Blackmon, Jenkins
 "Attack Me With Your Love" – 6:31 – Blackmon, Kendrick
 "Rigor Mortis" – 6:16 – Blackmon, Leftenant, Leftenant
 "Room 123 (She's Strange)" – 6:58 – Blackmon, Jenkins, Leftenant, Singleton

References

Cameo (band) compilation albums
1999 compilation albums
PolyGram compilation albums